Nirun Boonyarattaphan also known as Natoi Senbei (Natoi Sembe) is a Thai voice actor and television host.

He has been a regular voice actor for an anime programming block "9 Cartoon", he also appeared as children's TV presenter for 9 Cartoon during the 1980s and 2000s. Nirun got his nickname in voice acting industry from the character "Norimaki Senbei" from Dr. Slump, the role which made him famous amongst young cartoon fans as Natoi Senbe. (The term 'Na' in Thai means 'a younger sibling of mother' while 'Toi' is his real nickname.)

Filmography

Voice over roles

Anime
 Doraemon - Goda Takeshi
 Dr. Slump - Senbei Norimaki
 Tōshō Daimos - Kazuya Ryūzaki
 Cobra - Cobra
 Dragon Quest Dai's Great Adventure - Pop, Baran
 Fist of the North Star - Kenshiro, Juda
 Saint Seiya: The Lost Canvas - Pegasus Tenma, Pisces Albafica
 Ghost Sweeper Mikami - Tadao Yokoshima
 Yu Yu Hakusho - Urameshi Yūsuke, Seiryu, Suzuki, Elder Toguro, Karasu, Itsuki
 City Hunter - Saeba Ryo
 Kinnikuman - Kinniku Suguru
 Dream Soldier Wingman - Hirono Kenta
 Pokémon - Takeshi
 Revolutionary Girl Utena - Kyouichi Saionji, Akio Ohtori
 Sailor Moon - Mamoru Chiba
 Magic Knight Rayearth - Zagato, Lantis
 Beyblade V-Force - Hiwatari Kai
 Zatch Bell! - Kiyo Takamine
 Kyō Kara Ore Wa!! - Takashi Mitsuhashi
 Inuyasha - Inuyasha
 Mirmo! - Setsu Yuki
 Slamdunk - Sakuragi Hanamichi, Maki Shinichi
 Hunter X Hunter - Leorio
 Gundam Wing  - Heero Yuu
 Dragon Ball Z - Goku, Freeza
 Saint Seiya - Pegasus Seiya
 Saint Seiya: Chapter Hades - Pegasus Seiya, Taurus Aldebaran
 Digimon Savers - Daimon Masaru
 The Law of Ueki - Ueki Kosuke
 Tokyo Mew Mew - Masaya Aoyama
 Tokyo Babylon - Subaru Sumeragi
 The Prince of Tennis - Tezuka Kunimitsu
 Yaiba - Musashi Miyamoto, Takeshi Onimaru, Gekko
 Detective Conan - Kudo Shinichi, Mouri Kogoro (since season 2)
 Inazuma Eleven - Shuya Goenji, Heigoro Kabeyama
 Ranma ½ (Modernine TV dub) - Saotome Ranma
 Pygmalio - Aznus
 RG Veda - Yasha-ō
 Shōnen Onmyōji - Abe no Seimei
 Idaten Jump - Koei
 Kato-chan Ken-chan Gokigen TV - The Detective Story - Ken Shimura
 Ronin Warriors (Channel 5) - Ryo Sanada, Sage Date
 Perman - Birdman

Tokusatsu dubbing 
 Dai Sentai Goggle-V - Ken'ichi Akama/Goggle Red, Kanpei Kuroda/Goggle Black
 Chōjin Sentai Jetman - Ryū Tendō/Red Hawk
 Kyōryū Sentai Zyuranger - Geki/Tyranno Ranger
 Gosei Sentai Dairanger - Ryō of the Heavenly Fire Star/Ryu Ranger
 Ultraman Taro - Kotarou Higashi, Tadao Nanbara
 Kamen Rider Agito - Makoto Hikawa/Kamen Rider G3, Kaoru Kino/Another Agito
 Kidou Keiji Jiban - Naoto Tamura/Jiban
 Tokkei Winspector - Ryōma Kagawa/Fire
 Seiun Kamen Machineman - Ken Takase/Nick/Machineman

Other dubbing 
The Lord of the Rings film trilogy - Elrond (Hugo Weaving)
Shaun of the Dead - Shaun (Simon Pegg)
Paddle Pop Ad.
McDonald's Happy Meal Ad.
Colleen Coloured Pencils Ad.

Film 
Jon Kub Daeng (จ้อนกับแดง) (1990)
Just Kids (ลูกตลกตกไม่ไกลต้น) (2006)

References

1955 births
Living people
Nirun Boonyarattaphan
Nirun Boonyarattaphan
Nirun Boonyarattaphan
Nirun Boonyarattaphan
Nirun Boonyarattaphan